Potamites hydroimperator is a species of lizard which is endemic to eastern Peru, where it is known from El Sira Communal Reserve. The species is known to occur in and near streams in the El Sira Mountains. They are under threat from illegal gold mining in the region.

References

hydroimperator
Lizards of South America
Reptiles of Peru
Reptiles described in 2021